Alisa Borisovna Efimova (born 8 June 1999) is a Finnish-Russian pair skater. Competing for Germany with Ruben Blommaert, she is the 2022 Grand Prix of Espoo silver medalist.

Earlier in her career, she represented Russia with Alexander Korovin. The pair won one Grand Prix medal, silver at the 2018 Skate America, and five medals on the ISU Challenger Series, including gold at the 2018 CS Nebelhorn Trophy and 2018 CS Golden Spin of Zagreb.

Personal life 
Efimova was born in Kouvola, Finland. She moved to Moscow in 2014 and then to Saint Petersburg in 2017. Her mother is figure skating coach Marina Shirsova who currently works in Lappeenranta, Finland.

Career

Early years 
Efimova began learning to skate in 2002. She represented Finland internationally until 2014 when she moved to Moscow and switched from singles to pairs. She began competing with her first pair skating partner, Alexander Korovin, in 2014. Their international debut came in February 2016 at the Hellmut Seibt Memorial. They won the silver medal, finishing second to Italy's Valentina Marchei / Ondřej Hotárek.

2016–2017 season 
Coached by Natalia Pavlova and Alexander Zaitsev in Moscow, Efimova/Korovin debuted on the Grand Prix series, placing seventh at the 2016 Rostelecom Cup in November. Later that month, the two received the silver medal at the 2016 CS Tallinn Trophy, having ranked second in the short program, first in the free skate, and second overall behind Alina Ustimkina / Nikita Volodin of Russia. After placing eighth at the 2017 Russian Championships, they took silver at the Cup of Tyrol in March 2017.

2017–2018 season 
Efimova/Korovin relocated to Saint Petersburg to be coached by Oleg Vasiliev and Tamara Moskvina. In September, the pair placed fifth at their season opener, the 2017 CS Lombardia Trophy and then won bronze at the 2017 CS Ondrej Nepela Trophy a week later. In November, they took silver at the 2017 CS Tallinn Trophy behind Australia's Ekaterina Alexandrovskaya / Harley Windsor. They had no Grand Prix assignments. They finished ninth at the 2018 Russian Championships.

2018–2019 season 
In September, Efimova/Korovin won their first international gold medal at their first event of the season, the 2018 CS Nebelhorn Trophy. Ranked fourth in the short program and first in the free skate, they outscored the silver medalists, Alexa Scimeca Knierim / Chris Knierim, by 1.72 points.

Efimova/Korovin competed at two Grand Prix events, the 2018 Skate America and 2018 Rostelecom Cup. In October, Efimova/Korovin won their first Grand Prix medal, silver, at the 2018 Skate America. Ranked second in the short program and third in the free skate, they won the silver medal behind their teammates Evgenia Tarasova / Vladimir Morozov. In mid-November, they competed at the 2018 Rostelecom Cup, where they finished fifth after placing fourth in the short program and fifth in the free skate.

In early December, Efimova/Korovin won their second Challenger Series gold medal of the season at the 2018 CS Golden Spin of Zagreb. Ranked first in the short program and second in the free skate, they again narrowly beat Alexa Scimeca Knierim / Chris Knierim. This time Efimova/Korovin beat them by 1.05 points. At this event, Efimova/Korovin also scored their personal best score of 183.89 points.

At the 2019 Russian Championships, Efimova/Korovin placed sixth.

2019–2020 season 
Beginning the season on the Challenger series, Efimova/Korovin were seventh at the 2019 CS Nebelhorn Trophy, then won the silver medal at the 2019 CS Finlandia Trophy.  They finished eighth of eight teams at the 2019 Cup of China.  They placed fourth at the 2019 NHK Trophy.

At the 2020 Russian Championships, Efimova/Korovin placed fourth in the short program.  The free skate was a struggle, with them placing tenth in that segment and dropping to ninth place overall.

Programs

Pairs with Blommaert

Pairs with Korovin

Ladies' singles

Competitive highlights 
GP: Grand Prix; CS: Challenger Series

Pairs with Blommaert for Germany

Pairs with Korovin for Russia

Ladies' singles for Finland

Detailed results 
With Korovin

References

External links 

 

1999 births
Russian female pair skaters
Finnish female single skaters
People from Kouvola
Living people
Universiade gold medalists for Russia
Universiade medalists in figure skating
Competitors at the 2019 Winter Universiade
Finnish people of Russian descent
Finnish emigrants to Russia
Sportspeople from Kymenlaakso